Cobrico is a town in Victoria, Australia.  The town is located in the Shire of Corangamite. At the 2016 Census, Cobrico had a population of 80.

References

External links

Towns in Victoria (Australia)
Shire of Corangamite